Kharadar is a neighbourhood in District South of Karachi, Pakistan. Kharadar and the adjacent communities of Mithadar and Jodia Bazaar together form what is regarded as the original core of Karachi.

Etymology
Kharadar literally means Brackish Gate in both Sindhi and Urdu.

Location
Kharadar is located in central Karachi, near the Port of Karachi. Together with the adjacent community of Mithadar, it forms what is regarded as the original core of Karachi, when the city was known as "Kalachi Jo Goath." The combined area of the two is approximately 35 square kilometers.

History

The neighbourhood was named after one of two gates to the old city of Karachi built in 1729 – the other being Mitha Dar or "Sweet Gate," (referring to the potable, fresh water of the Lyari River) which is now the name of the neighborhood adjacent to the northern edge of Kharadar.  Both gates were torn down in 1860 after the British conquered Sindh 13 years earlier.

Economy
Kharadar, along with Mithadar, is a center for Karachi's textile industry, with several garment factories and wholesalers located in the adjacent Bolton Markets, as well as numerous textile markets along Laxmi Das Street. Kharadar has also been home to a Muslim South Indian community since the 1890s – a legacy reflected in the name of the nearby market, the Cochinwala Markets named after residents of the city of Cochin in South India.

Demographics
Kharadar being the oldest area along with Mithadar and Lyari is known for its diversity and unity. It is the home to people from various faiths. The area has Darya Lal Mandir belongs to Hindu community, Khoja Isna Ashri Masjid  belongs to Shia community & one of the largest Ismaili JamatKhana, belongs to Nizari Isma'ili community. Ismaili Muslims traders who originally settled in Kharadar after having moved from Kutch, Kathiawar in Gujarat in the 16th and 17th centuries – well before the British Raj. One of the earliest Ismailis in Kharadar was Syed Ghulam Ali Shah, or "Ghulmali Shah" of  the Kadiwala clan, was a prominent missionary in Sindh, Kutch and Kathiawar. He died in Karachi in 1792 when there were only a handful Ismailis. Rather than being buried amongst a small community, his body was transported to Kera in Gujarat for burial. The Ismaili community grew rapidly following a famine in Kutch in 1820, during which 250 Ismailis families fled the area to settle in Kharadar, where they built their first house of worship in the Kagzi Bazar ("Paper Market") in 1825. The area housed the headquarters of the Ismaili faith in Pakistan, until they were moved north to Garden. Kharadar also has a large Memon community.

Tourism

Kharadar remains a major tourist destination in Karachi. The New Memon Masjid's Foundation-Stone was laid on 24 August 1949 By the Governor General Khuwaja Nazim UD Din. It is one of the largest mosque in the city and has a capacity of 10000 people. Among the most popular sights are Wazir Mansion, birth place of the founder of Pakistan Quaid-e-Azam, Karachi Port Trust Building which administers the Port of Karachi, ancient Hindu temple Darya Lal Mandir and Kharadar JamatKhana which is one of the largest Jamatkhana of Nizari Ismaili community.

See also
Kharadar General Hospital
Saddar Town

References

External links 
 Karachi Website
 Saddar Town

Neighbourhoods of Karachi